"Jupiter Five" is a science fiction short story by British writer Arthur C. Clarke, first published in the magazine If in 1953. It appeared again in Clarke's collection of short stories Reach for Tomorrow, in 1956, and deals with the detection and exploration of an old spaceship from outside the Solar System.

Plot summary
Professor Forster is a distinguished scientist on an expedition with the spacecraft Arnold Toynbee.  He determines that the innermost satellite of Jupiter, Jupiter V, is a parked spacecraft from "Culture X", an ancient race of reptiles from outside the Solar System.  Culture X coexisted with insectoid Martians, and settled the smaller rocky planets and moons throughout the Solar System apart from the Moon of the Earth. Jupiter V is discovered to be a spherical metal vehicle with a diameter of 30 kilometers.  It contains an art gallery with millions of exhibits.  One of the art objects is a depiction of a member of Culture X, which Forster dubs "The Ambassador".

It becomes clear that "The Ambassador" was intended explicitly for Mankind. Culture X predicted that intelligent life would develop on Earth and eventually achieve space flight; the statue is a message of greeting and goodwill spanning the gulf of time between its creators' ancient extinction and the arrival of the space travelers from Earth.

A science writer, Randolph Mays, arrives with his pilot and his secretary. Forster takes advantage of a loophole in space law and claims salvage rights to Jupiter V in the name of the World Science Organization.  Mays tries to steal "The Ambassador" and other art objects, but Forster turns Mays' companions against him, forcing him to return the stolen items.

Reception

"Jupiter Five" belongs among Clarke's "few attempts at melodrama", together with his short stories "Breaking Strain" (1949) and "Guardian Angel" (1950), according to David N. Samuelson. Thus, it represents one of few cases in which Clarke overcame his "reluctance to tell traditional action-adventure story in the pulp tradition" due to "his literary allegiances and a desire to downplay the thoughtless romanticism evident in such tales of derring-do" (Samuelson). Critic David Samuelson, describes the work  as not having significant literary importance.

Influence

The idea of an artifact left behind by a spacefaring alien race for humans to discover after they achieved space flight also showed up in "The Sentinel", a 1948 (published 1951) Clarke short story about the discovery of an ancient artifact on the Moon and the major basis for 2001: A Space Odyssey, the 1968 novel and film Clarke developed in partnership with director Stanley Kubrick. However, the artifacts in "Sentinel" and "Odyssey" are speculated on in-story (in "Sentinel") or explicitly stated (in the novel version of "Odyssey") as being set as a warning to the alien race that humans were in space.

Early drafts of the 2001 novel did include the moon Jupiter V as the location where the Star Gate was located, instead of on Iapetus as in the final version of the novel, with revelation that Jupiter V had been artificially sculpted and placed into its precise orbit by the builders of the Star Gate.

"Jupiter Five" was the inspiration for The Diamond Moon, the fifth novel in the Venus Prime series by Paul Preuss.

References 

1953 short stories
Amalthea (moon)
Fiction set on Jupiter's moons
Short stories by Arthur C. Clarke
Works originally published in If (magazine)